This list contains an incomplete enumeration of Slovak bands, not including classical ensembles.

A
 AMO
 Anthology
 April Weeps
 AYA

B
 Banket
 The Beatmen
 The Bridgeheads
 Bruno Benetton Free Band

C
 Collegium Musicum

D
 Desmod
 Dzierzynski Bitz

E
 Elán

F
 Fun Master

H
 Horkýže Slíže
 Hrdza

I
 Iné Kafe

K
 Kalijuge
 King Shaolin
 Kmetoband
 Kollárovci
 Kontrafakt
 Korben Dallas

L
 The Last Days of Jesus
 Lobby
 Lojzo
 Longital

M
 Majster Kat
 Malokarpatan
 Metalinda
 Modus
 Morna

N
 No Name

O
 Obliterate

P
 Peha
 Prúdy

R
 Rozpor

S
 Signum Regis
 Ska2tonics
 Slobodná Európa
 The Soulmen

T
 Taktici
 Team
 Tublatanka
 TWiiNS

W
 Wayd

Z
 Zóna A

Slovak